

Belgium
Belgian Congo – Pierre Ryckmans, Governor-General of the Belgian Congo (1934–1946)

France
 French Somaliland – 
 Jean Victor Louis Joseph Chalvet, Governor of French Somaliland (1944–1946)
 Paul Henri Siriex, Governor of French Somaliland (1946–1950)
 Guinea – 
 Jacques Georges Fourneau, acting Governor of Guinea (1944–1946)
 Édouard Louis Terrac, Governor of Guinea (1946–1948)

Portugal
 Angola – Vasco Lopes Alves, High Commissioner of Angola (1943–1947)

Republic of China
 Taiwan – Chen Yi, Governor-General of Taiwan (25 October 1945 – May 1947)

United Kingdom
 Aden – Sir Reginald Stuart Champion, Governor of Aden (1945–1950)
 Malta Colony
Edmond Schreiber, Governor of Malta (1944–1946)
Francis Douglas, Governor of Malta (1946–1949)
 Northern Rhodesia – Sir Eubule John Waddington, Governor of Northern Rhodesia (1941–1947)

Colonial governors
Colonial governors
1946